Princess Daphne is a fictional character from the Dragon's Lair series of video games. She was created and designed by Rick Dyer and Don Bluth and introduced in the original Dragon's Lair in 1983.

In the games, Princess Daphne is the beautiful daughter of King Aethelred and an unnamed queen. She serves as the series' damsel in distress. A beautiful maiden coveted by many princes and knights, her heart belongs to the kingdom's champion, Dirk the Daring.

Appearances
In the original Dragon's Lair game, Princess Daphne is kidnapped by the dragon Singe and imprisoned in a large crystal orb. Singe commanded King Aethelred to surrender his kingdom before sunset or the princess would die. Daphne appears in the final level of the game, giving Dirk directions to use the magic sword and slay the dragon. The story has been described by Crash as "a cross between an Arthurian romance and George and the Dragon".

In Dragon's Lair: Escape from Singe's Castle, the just-rescued Daphne has been cursed and falls asleep, but Dirk brings her back to life with a kiss, only to see her vanish. Then a figure known as the Shape Shifter appears to tell him that Singe was only guarding the gold of the wizard they are serving and Daphne belongs to him. It vanishes among smoke, and Dirk sets off to save the princess.

In Dragon's Lair II: Time Warp, 10 years have passed after her adventure with Singe. Daphne and Dirk are married and have 13 children. However, she is again abducted, this time by the evil wizard Mordroc, who moves her through time and wants to enslave her with the Ring of Death (the same ring as in Der Ring des Nibelungen). At the end of the game, the Ring transforms her into a monster, but Dirk saves her by removing it from her finger and then revives her with a kiss. The game also features Daphne's mother, who is shown as a fat and furious woman chasing Dirk at the start of the game.

In Dragon's Lair III: The Curse of Mordread, Mordroc's evil witch sister Mordread captures Dirk's homestead into an orb on her staff. Dirk was not in the house, so he begins pursuing Mordread to restore his home, and Daphne inside it.

Dragon's Lair 3D: Return to the Lair follows a similar story as the first two games, as Daphne is captured by Singe commanded by Mordroc and taken through a portal, but leaves behind an amulet that allows her to talk to and guide Dirk as he works his way through the castle holding her prisoner. She is impersonated by Dirk's dark alter-ego, later revealing that the "Daphne" Dirk was speaking to had been Mordroc all along. Dirk eventually defeats Mordroc and saves the princess.

In the cartoon series, her character and role are far more developed. She is an adventurous character, eagerly abandoning her regal persona to join Dirk and Timothy during their adventures.

Design and portrayal
Princess Daphne was originally created by Rick Dyer's Advanced Microcomputer Systems (AMS, later RDI Video Systems) team, then completely redesigned by the ex-Disney artist and animator Don Bluth. Bluth took his inspiration from photographs from the producer Gary Goldman's collection of old issues of Playboy magazine, ultimately putting Daphne "in a very-revealing one piece 'thong' bathing suit with a sheer veil that partially covered her". Due to the limited budget's constraints, Daphne's in-game vocals were supplied by the head of AMS' Clean-up Department, Vera Lanpher.

For Dragon's Lair II, where Daphne has experienced more than a dozen births, Bluth said "he thought it would be interesting if Daphne looked just as beautiful as ever; there's absolutely no sign she's been through anything". Professional voice actress Ellen Gerstell voiced the character in the cartoon, wherein her attire is a less-revealing dress.

Reception
Princess Daphne was met with mostly positive reception and greatly contributed to the success of the game, which was then ported to various home platforms and followed by several sequels, remakes and spin-offs. She has been cited by multiple publications as one of the most attractive characters in video game history. UGO included her on their 2010 list of top 50 "video game hotties": "When the game was released, Daphne was the best-looking video game heroine around, so we still have a bit of a soft spot for her today". Including her at the 14th place on a similar list in 2012, Larry Hester of Complex opined Daphne "might be the finest damsel in distress ever. Sorry, Peach, Disney-style cel animation wins again".

Back in 1983, JoyStik'''s Joe Mendsky wrote "Daphne may look like the closest thing to a porn star in the annals of the video game, but she's not dumb. She's seen the line of quarters across the floor at the Denver arcade". Nearly three decades later, Complex said of her that there has "only ever really been one reason to play Dragon's Lair", and stated: "Never mind that the gameplay was nothing more than a quarter-sucking game of trial-and-error and memorization. And, oh, God: Princess Daphne and her little sheer black dress. Jesus Christ. She was way too sexy. Our little brains exploded". Ranking her as the 14th "hottest video game girl of all time" in 2013, Steve Jenkins of CheatCodes.com wrote: "Don Bluth's animated portrayal of Daphne, the princess who just can't seem to keep out of trouble, was the real attraction in this game… and attractive she was. (...) Princess Daphne's love of shear(sic!) clothing, plunging necklines, and her eternal 'damsel in distress' neediness made 50 cents a bargain to spend some quality time with her". Writing about the reason Dragon's Lair became so popular, Nikola Suprak of Hardcore Gamer stated: "Years of playing video games has made me very familiar with the 'save the princess' motif, which makes me extremely suspicious about Daphne's princess credentials. There is a far greater chance that she is just a stripper with the stage name Princess than an actual princess, because if actual princesses dressed like she did the royal weddings wouldn't be so boring to watch".

Jon M. Gibson of GameSpy called Daphne "the epitome of a damsel in distress". Rob Mead of ST Format wrote "Daphne has to be the dippiest woman on the planet. She's gone and got herself kidnapped again. Can you believe it? The woman is a victim. She might as well walk around with the words 'Kidnap me' tattooed on her forehead". Charlie Barratt of GamesRadar included her among the seven "damsels you DON'T want to save", arguing that "underneath the skimpy leotard and fluttering eyelashes, Daphne's no deeper than a cardboard cutout. No smarter than a blow-up doll bimbo. Nothing more than salacious and cynical bait for your hard-earned quarters (and Dragon's Lair swallowed a LOT of quarters)". Glamour model Tara Babcock ranked the "beyond beautiful" Daphne as the 16th "hottest video game" and wrote that "her half-naked, yet regal appearance, flowing blonde hair, big eyes with batting lashes and cute, ditzy appearance ... has been the subject of much controversy over 'sexism' in gaming!"

Daphne's voice was described by Earl Green of Classic Gamer Magazine as "a high pitched voice that could cause harm to small pets". Green also wrote that "those of us who were entering adolescence at the time never quite forgave the TV show for covering Princess Daphne up, even though a vast improvement was made in giving her more personality and more intelligence, rather than the original game's helium-voiced ditzy blonde". Reviewing Dragon's Lair 3D in 2002, GameSpots Ryan Davis wrote Daphne "sounds just as squeaky and ditzy as she did in 1983". Kristan Reed of Eurogamer wrote it "remains as simultaneously amusing and irritating as ever".

See also
DAPHNE, an emulator program to run the arcade version of Dragon's Lair'' and other LaserDisc games

References

External links
 Princess Daphne on IMDb

Female characters in animation
Fantasy video game characters
Female characters in video games
Princess characters in video games
Video game characters introduced in 1983
Characters created by Don Bluth